The following is a partial list of the "J" codes for Medical Subject Headings (MeSH), as defined by the United States National Library of Medicine (NLM).

This list continues the information at List of MeSH codes (I03). Codes following these are found at List of MeSH codes (J02). For other MeSH codes, see List of MeSH codes.

The source for this content is the set of 2006 MeSH Trees from the NLM.

– technology, industry, and agriculture

– agriculture
  – animal husbandry
  – aquaculture
  – fisheries
  – dairying
  – gardening
  – hydroponics

– architecture
  – facility design and construction
  – architectural accessibility
  – elevators and escalators
  – floors and floor coverings
  – hospital design and construction
  – interior design and furnishings
  – location directories and signs
  – parking facilities

– commerce
  – commodification
  – entrepreneurship
  – marketing
  – advertising
  – marketing of health services
  – social marketing

– engineering
  – biomedical engineering
  – chemical engineering
  – human engineering
  – man-machine systems
  – sanitary engineering

– household articles
  – bedding and linens
  – cooking and eating utensils

– household products
  – cosmetics
  – detergents
  – soaps

– industry
  – barbering
  – beauty culture
  – book industry
  – ink
  – paper
  – chemical industry
  – drug industry
  – drug packaging
  – drug labeling
  – orphan drug production
  – extraction and processing industry
  – metallurgy
  – welding
  – mining
  – coal mining
  – food industry
  – food handling
  – cookery
  – cooking and eating utensils
  –  automatic food dispensers
  – food packaging
  – food-processing industry
  – meat-packing industry
  – abattoirs
  – food services
  –  hospital food service
  – menu planning
  – restaurants
  – food supply
  – food technology
  – food analysis
  – food inspection
  – food microbiology
  – food packaging
  – food labeling
  – food parasitology
  – food preservation
  – food irradiation
  – frozen foods
  – forestry
  – health care sector
  – laundering
  – product packaging
  – drug packaging
  – drug labeling
  – food packaging
  – food labeling
  – product labeling
  – tanning
  – textile industry
  – textiles
  – cotton fiber
  – nylons
  – wool
  – tobacco industry

– manufactured materials
  – adhesives
  – biomimetic materials
  –  artificial membranes
  – lipid bilayers
  – liposomes
  – virosomes
  – cellophane
  – ceramics
  – clothing
  – protective clothing
  – ear protective devices
  –  protective gloves
  –  surgical gloves
  – space suits
  – shoes
  – construction materials
  – glass
  – wood
  – cooking and eating utensils
  – elastomers
  – polyurethanes
  – rubber
  – neoprene
  – silicone elastomers
  – firearms
  – industrial oils
  – ink
  – liquid crystals
  – nanostructures
  – nanotubes
  – nanotubes
  – nanotubes
  – quantum dots
  – nylons
  – paint
  – lacquer
  – paper
  – protective devices
  – air bags
  – ear protective devices
  – eye protective devices
  – head protective devices
  – masks
  – laryngeal masks
  – mouth protectors
  – protective clothing
  –  protective gloves
  –  surgical gloves
  – space suits
  – respiratory protective devices
  – seat belts
  – sports equipment
  – wool

– military science

– power plants
  – nuclear reactors

– technology
  – automation
  – robotics
  – biomedical technology
  – biomedical enhancement
  – genetic enhancement
  – nanomedicine
  – biotechnology
  – biomimetics
  – bioreactors
  – industrial microbiology
  – educational technology
  – audiovisual aids
  –  illustrated books
  – exhibits
  – maps
  – medical illustration
  –  structural models
  –  anatomic models
  – manikins
  – visible human project
  – motion pictures
  – multimedia
  – optical storage devices
  – videodisc recording
  – compact disks
  – cd-i
  – cd-rom
  – radio
  – tape recording
  – videotape recording
  – television
  –  video microscopy
  – videodisc recording
  – compact disks
  – cd-i
  – cd-rom
  – videotape recording
  – man-machine systems
  – miniaturization
  – nanotechnology
  – microfluidics
  – nanomedicine
  – quality control
  –  dental technology
  –  medical technology
  –  pharmaceutical technology
  –  radiologic technology
  – technology transfer

– transportation
  – aviation
  – aircraft
  – air ambulances
  – space flight
  – extravehicular activity
  – spacecraft
  – motor vehicles
  – ambulances
  – automobiles
  – motorcycles
  – off-road motor vehicles
  – railroads
  – ships

The list continues at List of MeSH codes (J02).

J01